Asteroplanus is a genus of diatoms belonging to the family Fragilariaceae.

Species:
 Asteroplanus karianus (Grunow) C.Gardner & R.M.Crawford

References

Fragilariophyceae
Diatom genera